Wayne Ronald Drysdale  is a Canadian politician, who served as an Alberta MLA from 2008 to 2019. He is a member of the Progressive Conservatives. He was Minister of Transportation in the cabinet of Jim Prentice.

He was elected in the 2008 provincial election to represent the electoral district of Grande Prairie Wapiti in the Legislative Assembly of Alberta and re-elected there in 2012 and 2015.

He did not seek re-election in 2019.

Election results

References

Alberta municipal councillors
Progressive Conservative Association of Alberta MLAs
Living people
Members of the Executive Council of Alberta
21st-century Canadian politicians
United Conservative Party MLAs
Year of birth missing (living people)